Wyndham Street is a one-way street in Central, Hong Kong. It is one of the earliest colonial streets, once known as Pedder Hill.

Location
It starts at the junction with Hollywood Road and Arbuthnot Road, near the Central Police Station, and heads downhill to terminate at Queen's Road Central, near the Entertainment Building.

History
Lieutenant William Pedder the first lieutenant of the Nemesis was the first harbour master of Hong Kong, and established Pedder Street as the centre of Victoria City's commerce in the early colonial days. Pedder had his office built on the rocks above what is now Wyndham Street. For many years, the site on the top was known as Pedder's Hill.

In the early 20th century, Wyndham Street was nicknamed "Flower Street" because of the numerous stalls selling flowers. In 1928, the flower stalls were moved to D'Aguilar Street and the "Flower Street" name became attached to the new location.

On 18 August 1997, a Mitsubishi Lancer crashed on Wyndham Street, resulting in the death of 3 people and injuring 10 others.

See also
 List of streets and roads in Hong Kong

References

Further reading

External links

Google Maps of Wyndham Street

Central, Hong Kong
Roads on Hong Kong Island